Kristis Andreou (born August 12, 1994) is a Cypriot football player who plays as a centre forward for Aris Limassol.

External links
 

1994 births
Living people
Cypriot footballers
Cypriot expatriate footballers
Cypriot First Division players
Ayia Napa FC players
AEL Limassol players
AEZ Zakakiou players
Enosis Neon Paralimni FC players
Aris Limassol FC players
FK Žalgiris players
A Lyga players
Expatriate footballers in Lithuania
Cypriot expatriates in Lithuania
Sportspeople from Limassol
Association football forwards